Malva aegyptia, the Egyptian mallow, is a species of flowering plant in the family Malvaceae. It is native to North Africa, Spain, Greece, and western Asia as far as Turkmenistan, and has been introduced to South Africa. With Althaea hirsuta it is a parent of the ancient hybrid × Malvalthaea transcaucasica.

References

aegyptia
Flora of North Africa
Flora of Spain
Flora of Greece
Flora of Crete
Flora of the Caucasus
Flora of Western Asia
Flora of Turkmenistan
Plants described in 1753 
Taxa named by Carl Linnaeus